Trinidad Yelamos (14 April 1915 – 17 January 1989) was a French racing cyclist. He rode in the 1939 Tour de France.

References

1915 births
1989 deaths
French male cyclists